The following list includes notable people who were born or have lived in Jacksonville, Illinois. For a similar list organized alphabetically by last name, see the category page People from Jacksonville, Illinois.

Authors and academics 

 Dr. Greene Vardiman Black (1836–1915), considered the "father of modern dentistry"; first to use nitrous oxide gas for extracting teeth without pain
 Martha Capps Oliver (1845–1917), poet, hymnwriter
 Everett Dean Martin (born and raised in Jacksonville), writer, lecturer, social psychologist, and an advocate of adult education Final Director of the People's Institute of Cooper Union in New York City from 1922-1934
 Frank Haven Hall, inventor of the Hall Braille Writer and other Braille printing devices
 Bell Elliott Palmer (1873–1947), playwright, born and died in Jacksonville
 Willis Polk, architect
 J. F. Powers (1917–1999), Roman Catholic short story author and novelist; born in Jacksonville
 Alfred Henry Sturtevant (1891–1970), geneticist; constructed the first genetic map of a chromosome (1913)
 Wilson "Bob" Tucker (1914–2006), mystery, adventure, and science fiction writer; lived in Jacksonville
 Jonathan Baldwin Turner (1805–1899) classical scholar, botanist, and political activist
 Janice May Udry (1928–), Caldecott Medal-winning children's author, born in Jacksonville
 Bari Wood (1936–), science fiction, crime and horror author, born in Jacksonville

Media and arts 

 Marjorie Best (1903–1997), Academy Award-winning costume designer; born in Jacksonville
 Roger Deem (1958-2020), photographer
 William Fitzsimmons, folk singer; lived in Jacksonville
 Richard Moore (1925–2009), cinematographer and co-founder of Panavision; born in Jacksonville
 Kyra Phillips, correspondent for CNN and HLN, raised in Jacksonville
 Frank Reaugh (1860–1945), western artist
 Brian Sherwin, art critic; born in Jacksonville
 Liam Sullivan, actor; born in Jacksonville

Military  

 Benjamin Grierson (1826–1911), Civil War era general; commanded the all-Black 10th Cavalry known as Buffalo Soldiers; music teacher from Jacksonville
 John J. Hardin (1810–1847), congressman; killed as a colonel leading the First Regiment, Illinois Volunteer Infantry, at the Battle of Buena Vista during the Mexican War
 Martin Davis Hardin (1837–1923), brigadier general during the Civil War; born in Jacksonville

Politics and law 

 James M. Barnes (1899–1958), U.S. congressman
 William H. Barnes, jurist
 William Jennings Bryan (1860–1925), lawyer and politician; ran for US president; known for his involvement in the Scopes Trial
 J. Edward Day (1914–1996), U.S. Postmaster General
 Stephen A. Douglas (1813–1861), U.S. senator and presidential candidate; settled in Jacksonville
 Joseph Duncan (1794–1844), sixth governor of Illinois
 Nancy Farmer (1956–), Missouri State Treasurer
 Paul Findley (1921–2019), U.S. congressman
 Hugh Green (1887–1968), Illinois legislator and lawyer
 Edward E. Johnston (1918–2011), high commissioner of the Trust Territory of the Pacific Islands
 Ruth Bryan Owen (1885–1954), U.S. congresswoman, ambassador to Denmark and Iceland, daughter of William Jennings Bryan
 Mary Louise Preis (1941–), state congressman from Maryland
 Harris Rowe (1923–2013), politician, lawyer, and businessman
 Richard Yates Rowe (1888–1973), politician and businessman
 Andrew Russel (1854–1934), Illinois politician and businessman
 Paul Samuell (1886–1938), Illinois Supreme Court justice
 Wiley Scribner (1840–1889), politician and acting governor of Montana Territory
 Owen P. Thompson (1852–1933), judge of the Seventh Judicial District of Illinois and a delegate to Democratic National Convention from Illinois in 1904
 Richard Yates (1818–1873), U.S. congressman (1851–1855) and senator (1865–1871); 13th governor of Illinois (1861–1865)

Sports 

 Jerry Barber (1916–1994), golfer with the PGA Tour, winner of 1961 PGA Championship
 Doug Brady (1969–), second baseman for the Chicago White Sox
 Red Dorman (1900–1974), outfielder for the Cleveland Indians
 Jim Hackett (1877–1961), pitcher and first baseman for the St. Louis Cardinals
"Blake" Hance (1996–), offensive lineman for the Cleveland Browns
 Mabel Holle (1920–2011), third basewoman and outfielder in the All-American Girls Professional Baseball League; born in Jacksonville
 Milton McPike (1939–2008), tight end for the San Francisco 49ers, educator and community leader; born in Jacksonville
 Brett Merriman (1966–), pitcher for the Minnesota Twins
 Ken Norton (1943–2013), boxer; broke Muhammad Ali's jaw in a historical heavyweight fight
 Ken Norton, Jr. (1966–), linebacker for Dallas Cowboys and San Francisco 49ers, defensive coordinator for Oakland Raiders; first NFL player to win three consecutive Super Bowls; born in Jacksonville
 Henry Eli "Harry" Staley (1866–1910), pitcher for the St. Louis Browns, Boston Beaneaters, and Pittsburgh Pirates; born in Jacksonville
 F. Calvert "Cal" Strong (1907–2001), Olympic water polo bronze medalist; born in Jacksonville
 Luther Haden "Dummy" Taylor (1875–1958), coach and pitcher for New York Giants and Cleveland Bronchos; died in Jacksonville

References

Jacksonville
Jacksonville